The Thochu bent-toed gecko (Cyrtodactylus thochuensis) is a species of gecko that is endemic to Thổ Chu Island in southwestern Vietnam.

References 

Cyrtodactylus
Reptiles described in 2012